Kachek Bel, also known as Kajak Bel and Kuchek Bel, may refer to:
 Kachek Bel-e Olya
 Kachek Bel-e Sofla